The Berlin–Palermo railway axis is project No. 1 of the Trans-European high-speed rail network (TEN-R), which involves the creation of a  high-speed rail line between Berlin and Palermo. It is designated as one of the main transport links connecting Central and Southern Europe, tracking through Germany, Austria and Italy.

Alignment and sections
From Berlin the line will run to the Central German Metropolitan Region of Halle/Leipzig, to Erfurt and to Southern Germany at Nuremberg, Ingolstadt and Munich. Crossing the border with Austria, it will continue through the state of Tyrol along Kufstein, Wörgl and the capital Innsbruck. It will enter Italian South Tyrol, passing Franzensfeste and Bolzano, run through Northeast Italy via Verona and Bologna, through Central Italy along Florence and Rome, and reach Southern Italy at Naples and finally shall ferry over to Messina and Palermo on Sicily.

Germany

The corridor begins at Berlin Hauptbahnhof opened in 2006 and runs via the rebuilt Anhalt Railway (up to Bitterfeld) and Dessau–Leipzig railway to Leipzig Hauptbahnhof. The line shall continue to Erfurt Hauptbahnhof on the Erfurt–Leipzig/Halle high-speed railway, which opened in December 2015. Likewise, the southern continuation of this route along the Nuremberg–Erfurt high-speed railway opened in December 2017.

In the meantime, service is provided by tilting ICE T trains running on sections of the Leipzig–Großkorbetha railway, the Thuringian Railway, and the winding Saal Railway via Jena Paradies station, bypassing Erfurt on their way from Leipzig to Nürnberg Hauptbahnhof. From Saalfeld station they cross the Rennsteig ridge of the Franconian Forest via the Leipzig–Probstzella railway and the Franconian Forest Railway and continue along the Bamberg-Hof railway (from Hochstadt-Marktzeuln) and the Nuremberg–Bamberg railway

Further to the south, the corridor runs via the Nuremberg–Munich high-speed railway line opened in 2006 to München Hauptbahnhof passing Ingolstadt Hauptbahnhof. The following section of the Munich–Rosenheim railway has already been upgraded to four-tracks up to Grafing station in order to separate mainline and suburban traffic. Finally the Rosenheim–Kufstein railway runs to the Austrian border and Kufstein station.

Austria

The heart of the Austrian section is the New Lower Inn Valley railway through the Tyrolean Unterland region. In particular the section between Wörgl and Baumkirchen is the most congested line of the whole TEN-network, a result of the Austrian national east-west traffic and the international north-south traffic sharing the same line. The largest section from Kundl to Baumkirchen is already completed and in operation since December 2012. The shorter section between Kundl and Kufstein (or Brannenburg in Bavaria), including a Wörgl bypass, is being planned.

At the Baumkirchen rail hub, new high-speed curves link with the Innsbruck bypass including the Inn Valley tunnel (German: Inntaltunnel), which is already used by freight trains, but still needs to be upgraded for passengers and connected with the existing Lower Inn Valley railway line for trains calling at Innsbruck Hauptbahnhof. The Inn Valley tunnel will connect directly with the future Brenner Base Tunnel bypassing the existing Brenner Railway across the Alpine divide up to the southern portal at Franzensfeste in South Tyrol, Italy. Construction of the main bore on the Austrian side began on 19 March 2015. The combined Inn Valley and Brenner Base tunnels will be the longest railway tunnel in the world.

Italy

In the course of several high-speed rail projects, the following lines have been built or significantly upgraded in Italy:
In 2009 work was completed on duplicating the Verona–Bologna line and upgrading it for  speeds, including several deviations. 
The Milan–Bologna high-speed line was opened on 13 December 2008. 
The Bologna–Florence high-speed line was opened on 13 December 2009. 
The Florence–Rome high-speed line was completed on 26 May 1992. 
The Rome–Naples high-speed line was partially opened on 19 December 2005 and completely on 13 December 2009. 
The Naples–Salerno high-speed line was opened in June 2008.

In recent decades, a Strait of Messina Bridge to Sicily has been proposed several times. The project has been halted by resolution of the Chamber of Deputies in October 2006., was resumed upon Berlusconi's re-election in 2008, and again discontinued in March 2013. On the mainland, an upgrade of the  Salerno–Reggio Calabria line is also proposed to increase speeds and capacity.

EU coordinator
On 20 July 2005, the European Union appointed coordinators for the five major trans-European rail transport projects to accelerate the realisation of these projects. It appointed the Belgian Karel Van Miert to coordinate the Berlin–Palermo rail corridor, who upon his death in June 2009 was succeeded by the Irish Pat Cox.

See also
Main line for Europe
Strait of Messina Bridge
Helsinki-Valletta Corridor
Rome-Berlin Axis
Trans-European corridors
Trans-European Transport Network

References

High-speed rail in Europe
High-speed railway lines
Proposed rail infrastructure in Europe
Proposed rail infrastructure in Germany
Proposed rail infrastructure in Italy
Strait of Messina Bridge